Westfield is a town in Aroostook County, Maine, United States. The population was 455 at the 2020 census.

Geography

Demographics

2010 census
At the 2010 census there were 549 people, 216 households, and 159 families living in the town. The racial makeup of the town was 98.9% White, 0.4% African American, and 0.7% Native American.
Of the 216 households 24.1% had children under the age of 18 living with them, 59.3% were married couples living together, 7.9% had a female householder with no husband present, 6.5% had a male householder with no wife present, and 26.4% were non-families. 21.8% of households were one person and 7.8% were one person aged 65 or older. The average household size was 2.40 and the average family size was 2.72.

The median age in the town was 48.3 years. 18.9% of residents were under the age of 18; 5.9% were between the ages of 18 and 24; 20.9% were from 25 to 44; 35% were from 45 to 64; and 19.1% were 65 or older. The gender makeup of the town was 50.8% male and 49.2% female.

2000 census
At the 2000 census there were 559 people, 218 households, and 156 families living in the town.  The population density was 13.9 people per square mile (5.4/km).  There were 237 housing units at an average density of 5.9 per square mile (2.3/km).  The racial makeup of the town was 97.67% White, 0.36% African American, 0.18% Native American, and 1.79% from two or more races.
Of the 218 households 27.5% had children under the age of 18 living with them, 59.6% were married couples living together, 7.3% had a female householder with no husband present, and 28.0% were non-families. 22.0% of households were one person and 11.5% were one person aged 65 or older.  The average household size was 2.43 and the average family size was 2.83.

The age distribution was 20.4% under the age of 18, 5.4% from 18 to 24, 26.1% from 25 to 44, 32.0% from 45 to 64, and 16.1% 65 or older.  The median age was 44 years. For every 100 females, there were 97.5 males.  For every 100 females age 18 and over, there were 98.7 males.

The median household income was $27,083 and the median family income  was $33,409. Males had a median income of $25,556 versus $17,250 for females. The per capita income for the town was $13,533.  About 8.8% of families and 15.0% of the population were below the poverty line, including 21.9% of those under age 18 and 28.4% of those age 65 or over.

References

Towns in Aroostook County, Maine
Towns in Maine